André Peton (12 January 1903 – 20 September 1992) was a French racing cyclist. He rode in the 1926 Tour de France.

References

External links
 

1903 births
1992 deaths
French male cyclists
Place of birth missing